Pacinje is a village on the right bank of the Pesnica River in the Municipality of Ptuj in northeastern Slovenia. The area is part of the traditional region of Styria. It is now included with the rest of the municipality in the Drava Statistical Region.

References

External links
Pacinje at Geopedia

Populated places in the City Municipality of Ptuj